Tim Rice is an English lyricist and author. The following are a list of his wins and nominations for awards in music.

He has been nominated for 5 Academy Awards, winning three for Best Original Song in 1992 for "A Whole New World" from Aladdin with Alan Menken, again in 1994 for "Can You Feel the Love Tonight" from The Lion King with Elton John, and again in 1996 for "You Must Love Me" from the film version of Evita with long-time collaborator Andrew Lloyd Webber. He has received five Grammy Awards, three Tony Awards, and a Primetime Emmy Award. Those accolades have given him the EGOT in the US. Rice has also received three Golden Globe Awards, two Laurence Olivier Awards, and a Drama Desk Award. Rice was inducted into the Songwriters Hall of Fame in 1999. In 2002, he was inducted as a Disney Legend. In 2008, he received a star on the Hollywood Walk of Fame.

Major awards

Academy Awards

British Academy Film Awards

Critics' Choice Movie Awards

Golden Globe Awards

Grammy Awards

Laurence Olivier Awards

Primetime Emmy Awards

Tony Awards

Miscellaneous awards

Annie Awards

Drama Desk Awards

Gold Derby Awards

Golden Raspberry Awards

Hawaii Film Critics Society Awards

Hollywood Music in Media Awards

Houston Film Critics Society Awards

International Film Music Critics Association Awards

Online Film & Television Association Awards

Phoenix Film Critics Society Awards

Royal Television Society

Satellite Awards

Special honors

American Theater Hall of Fame

Disney Legends Awards

Hollywood Walk of Fame

Songwriters Hall of Fame

References

Rice, Tim